Fr O'Neill's GAA is a Gaelic Athletic Association club founded in 1959 and based in the parish of Ballymacoda and Ladysbridge in Cork, Ireland. The club fields hurling and Gaelic football teams in competitions organised by the Cork county board and Imokilly division.
2022 Cork Senior A Hurling championship winners, title 1st

History
Fr O Neill's GAA club was founded in 1959.

The club won its first-ever Junior 'A' East Cork titles in 1996 completing a historic double in hurling and football. Brothers Dick and Ray O' Neill captaining the two sides in that year.

Fr O Neill's would contest two County Junior hurling finals in 1996 and 2002 winning the competition in 2005 when defeating Kilworth in Páirc Uí Rinn.

Jer Holland would go onto lead his side to Munster and All-Ireland glory and became the first Fr O Neill's man to walk up the steps of the Hogan Stand to lift the cup on 12 February 2006 in Croke Park.

Intermediate titles would follow in 2007 and 2016 with Ger O'Leary and joint captains Podge Butler and Adrian Kenneally lifting the trophy. 

The period from 2005 to 2015 was successful at underage level with Minor and Under-21 titles won at higher levels in both hurling and football. In 2015, Under 21 'A' hurling Junior 'A' Football and Junior 'B' hurling titles were captured.

After the county success in 2016, a young group of players were emerging. This led to an Under 21 Premier hurling title being won in 2018 when Fr O Neill's beat Glen Rovers, Charleville, Sarsfields, Blackrock and Midleton. The final against Midleton saw Fr O Neill's winning by 3-24 to 4-18. Captain Billy Dunne lead the winning team.

Fr O Neill's went on to win the 2019 Cork Premier Intermediate Hurling Championship defeating Kilworth 3-23 to 1-20 in Páirc Uí Rinn . Joint captains Daniel Harrington and Mark O'Keeffe lifted the trophy that year.
Their journey continued with a Munster crown captured versus Ballysaggart in Fraher field Dungarvan on 24 November 2-15 to 0-17. They would progress to an All Ireland Final in Croke Park in January 2020 where they suffered a one point defeat in an epic encounter against Kilkenny side Tullaroan.  

Back to back Senior A Final defeats followed versus Charleville in 2020 and Kanturk in 2021 
All that pain was washed away when they defeated Courcey Rovers  in Pairc Uí Chaoimh on a scoreline of 0-20  to 2-12 to reach Premier Senior Hurling for the first time and were crowned 2022 County Senior A Championship  on 9 October 2022. Captains Rob Culliane and Kevin O Sullivan lifted the cup and Billy Dunne received the Man of the Match award.

Honours
 Cork Senior A Hurling Championship
  Winners (1): 2022
  Runners-Up (2): 2020, 2021
 Cork Premier Intermediate Hurling Championship 
  Winners (1): 2019
 Munster Intermediate Club Hurling Championship
  Winners (1): 2019
 All-Ireland Intermediate Club Hurling Championship 
  Runners-Up (1): 2020
 Cork Intermediate Hurling Championship 
  Winners (2): 2007, 2016
 All-Ireland Junior Club Hurling Championship 
  Winners (1): 2006
 Munster Junior Club Hurling Championship 
  Winners (1): 2005
 Cork Junior Hurling Championship 
  Winners (1): 2005
 Cork Premier Under-21 A Hurling Championship 
  Winners (1): 2018
 Cork Premier 2 Minor Hurling Championship 
  Winners (1): 2011
  Runners-Up (2): 2009, 2012
 East Cork Junior A Hurling Championship 
  Winners (5): 1996, 1999, 2001, 2002, 2005
  Runners-Up (7):  1961, 1963, 1987, 1991, 1992, 2000, 2004
 East Cork Junior A Football Championship 
  Winners (4): 1996, 1998, 2006, 2015
East Cork Junior B  Hurling Championship 
Winners (3)
1972 , 1979, 2015

East Cork Junior B Football Championship
Winners (3)
1988 , 1992 , 2022

Notable players
 Declan Dalton
 Ger Millerick

References

External links
 Club website (archived 2011)

Gaelic games clubs in County Cork
Gaelic football clubs in County Cork
Hurling clubs in County Cork